Emirati Sign Language has been developed by the Zayed Higher Organization for People of Determination and is the first deaf sign language for the United Arab Emirates (UAE) dialect, and a unified reference language for those with hearing disabilities in the UAE. The UAE launched its first sign language dictionary in 2018, while the first dictionary of Unified Arabic Sign Language was released in 2001. The dictionary was compiled by eight authorities with the help of 60 people with hearing difficulties and sign language specialists from across the UAE, and is used to standardize the signs used by deaf people in the UAE. It includes details about the Emirati culture and heritage, such as traditional clothes, local food, and historical places, which was previously chosen, and is divided into many sections that cover topics such as numbers, countries, family, and religion. 

There are approximately 72 million deaf people worldwide, using more than 300 different sign languages, according to the World Federation of the Deaf (WFD).

References

External links 
UAE Sign Language Dictionary

Sign language isolates
Languages of the United Arab Emirates
Arab sign languages